Respiratory nitrate reductase may refer to:

 Nitrate reductase (cytochrome)
 Nitrate reductase